Las Delicias is a city in Baja California in Tijuana Municipality, Mexico. The city had a population of 15,486 as of 2010.

See also

References

External links

Populated places in Tijuana Municipality